Charles Eldridge Norris (August 11, 1921 – August 26, 1989) was an American jazz and blues guitarist.

Biography
Norris was born in Kansas City, Missouri, and raised in Chicago, where he was tutored in music composition and performance by Walter Dyett. He moved to Los Angeles in the mid-1940s, played in nightclubs, and developed a reputation as a session musician in Hollywood. He released some recordings under his own name in the late 1940s and early 1950s. He also accompanied the singers Percy Mayfield  and Floyd Dixon and for some time played in the Johnny Otis Orchestra. He also worked with such performers as Amos Milburn, Dinah Washington, and Little Richard. In 1980, he recorded a live album, The Los Angeles Flash, in Gothenburg, Sweden.

Norris died in Tustin, California, in 1989.

Tribute
The Swedish rock band The Chuck Norris Experiment claim to have taken their name from the guitarist, who recorded The Los Angeles Flash in their home city of Gothenburg, rather than from the actor of the same name, with whom the musician is sometimes confused.

Discography

With Jay McShann
McShann's Piano (Capitol, 1967)

References

1921 births
1989 deaths
African-American guitarists
Musicians from Kansas City, Missouri
American rhythm and blues guitarists
Guitarists from Missouri
American male guitarists
20th-century American guitarists
20th-century American male musicians
Southland Records artists
20th-century African-American musicians